Tenza is a town and municipality in the subregion of the Eastern Boyacá Province of the Colombian department Boyacá. Tenza borders La Capilla and Pachavita in the north, in the east the department of Cundinamarca, in the south with Sutatenza and in the east with Garagoa.

History 
Tenza used to be inhabited by the Muisca before the arrival of the Spanish conquistadores led by Gonzalo Jiménez de Quesada who was looking for emeralds. The village was ruled by the cacique of Cora, loyal to the zaque of Hunza. Modern Tenza was founded during the Spanish conquest of the Muisca by the Jiménez de Quesada, on June 24, Saint John's day, 1537.

Tenza used to be called Tenazuca, which in the Chibcha language of the Muisca means "going down at night".

Economy 
Livestock farming is the most important activity. The agriculture of Tenza is relatively modest with beans, peas, maize, yuca, arracacha, tomatoes, cucumbers and bananas. Some mining is executed in Tenza.

Born in Tenza 
 Juan Morales, former professional cyclist

References 

Municipalities of Boyacá Department
Populated places established in 1537
1537 establishments in the Spanish Empire
1537 disestablishments in the Muisca Confederation
Muysccubun